Juan Carlos Paz y Puente is a Mexican-born musician & educator. Professor Paz y Puente is the former Senior Vice President of Marketing and A&R director for Warner Music Mexico.

Prof. Paz y Puente was one of the founding members of the Fermatta Music Academy to which he is no longer affiliated having moved on to other endeavors since 2007.

Fermatta was the first School in Contemporary music in México that was officially recognized by the Mexican Government

Early career

As a musician he began playing the drums and making transcriptions and charts, then making arrangements for well known Traditional Mexican and Spanish recording artists, such as Armando Manzanero, and then became Musical Director, drummer and arranger for Pandora, Camilo Sesto, Hernaldo Zúñiga and Rocío Dúrcal all of with which he toured extensively.

Juan Carlos Paz y Puente was one of the Musical Directors for the Plácido Domingo and Friends concert with Frank Sinatra, Julie Andrews and John Denver.

Eventually commissioned as Production Manager for Luis Miguel, Paz y Puente then left to take the charge of the A&R department at Warner Music Mexico and was given the title of Vice President of A&R where he was responsible for the signing of Edith Marquez, Daniela Luján, Nudo, La Catrina,  Alvaro Abitia, and Niurka Kurbelo.

Due to his skills as a musician and music business man as well as producer and arranger, Paz y Puente was given the position of Senior Vice President of Marketing & A&R for Warner Music Mexico.

As producer, composer, arranger and musical director Paz y Puente has worked with an extensive list of artists like: Carlos Santana, Celia Cruz, David Foster, Vinnie Colaiuta, Rafa Sardina, Lucero, Jon Anderson, Peter Erskine, John Carpenter, Salvador Tercero, Eugenio Toussaint, Gregg Bissonette, Randy Waldman, Maná, Café Tacuba, Clare Fischer, José José, Guadalupe Pineda, Napoleón, Jorge Hernández from Los Tigres del Norte, Enrique Nery, Alejandro Fernández, Emmanuel, Ana Bárbara, Edith Márquez, Jorge Avendaño, Ana Gabriel, Mauricio Abaroa, Bill Schnee, Lee Sklar, Tim Pierce, Narada Michael Walden, Robbie Buchanan, Dave Frazer, Fabrizio Grossi, Francisco Céspedes, La Ley, Humberto Gatica, Ricardo Montaner, Bebu Silvetti, Luis Fernando Ochoa, Daniela Luján, Fernando Osorio, Emmanuele Rufinengo, Carlos Chávez Symphonic Orchestra, Eduardo Diazmuñoz, Loris Ceroni, Manuel Romero, Mark Kamins,  Jim Gaines, Joey Mosk, Piero Cassano, Thalía, Gabriel Puentes, Agustín Bernal, Arturo Velasco, Jorge Ferrón, Jean B. Smith, Erich Bulling, Oscar Vallejo, Michael Thompson, Bruce Gowdy, Mijares, Denise De Kalafe and Guillermo "Memo" Gil, to name but a few. He also participated in the Spanish version of "You'll See" for Madonna, written by Paz Martínez and produced by David Foster.

Awards and committees

Professor Paz y Puente is a recipient of the "El Sol de Oro" from the Mexican National Journalist Council and has been a member of the Blue Ribbon Committee for Latin Academy of Recording Arts & Sciences that overseas the Latin Grammy Awards.

As a producer for Francisco Céspedes' album Vida Loca, he won 3 Premios Amigo in Spain for: "Best Latin Album", "Best Male Latin Artist" and "Best New Latin Artist" by selling over a 1,000,000 albums worldwide.

Professor Paz y Puente frequently lectures at universities in the United States and Mexico. Professor Paz y Puente teaches periodically at UCLA and has taught both Song Composition and Latin Music Business there.

He founded M&L Music, a record label and publishing company with Roberto Figueroa, Mario Santos and Amir Agai. In a very short period of time, they produced and released Eugenio Toussaint's albums "El Pez Dorado" and "Trio". Enrique Nery "Solo Sessions", Clare Fischer "Introspectivo" and  Mario Santos’ "Escenas".

Mexican Bicentennial

In celebration of the Mexican Bicentennial, Juan Carlos Paz y Puente co-produced and arranged a special project with Mexican recording artist Elán Recuerdos y Tequila is a collection of songs from some of Latin America and Spain's most beloved and well known composers and songwriters with special musical arrangements meant to honor the songs' original melodies.

This project feature Peter Erskine on drums (Weather Report, Steely Dan, Diana Krall); percussionist Alex Acuña (Elvis Presley, U2, Weather Report) Brian Bromberg on bass (Dizzy Gillespie, Michael Bublé) Michael Thompson (guitarist) on guitar (Michael Jackson, Ringo Starr) Lee Thornburg  (Chicago, Supertramp) and orchestral arrangements by Eduardo Diazmuñoz.

Personal life

Juan Carlos is married to Sibila Reyes, they have two children.

Partial discography
 Eugenio Toussaint, album Trío, credit: Producer
 Eugenio Toussaint, album El Pez Dorado, credit: Producer	
Clare Fischer, album Introspectivo credit: Producer
Francisco Céspedes, album Vida Loca credit: Producer
Enrique Nery, album Solo sessions, credit: producer
Francisco Céspedes, album Donde Está la Vida credit: Producer and Composer
Café Tacuba, album Revés / Yo soy credit: A&R
Maná, album MTV Unplugged credit: A&R
La Ley, album Uno credit: A&R
La Ley, album Vértigo credit: A&R and Executive Producer
Edith Márquez, album Frente a ti credit: A&R and Executive Producer
Edith Márquez, album Caricias del cielo credit: A&R and Executive Producer
Lucero, album Mi destino credit: Composer
José José, album Homenaje en vivo 30 años credit: Arranger
El Tri, album Sinfónico credit: A&R and Executive Producer
El Tri, album Fin de siglo credit: A&R
El Tri, album Cuando tu no Estás credit: A&R
Ricardo Montaner, album Con la London Metropolitan Orchestra credit: A&R
Ricardo Montaner, album Es Así credit: A&R
Álex Lora, album Lora su Lira y sus Rolas credit: A&R
Elán, album Recuerdos y Tequila credit: Co-producer and arranger
Elán, album Street Child credit: Arranger
 Cielo y tierra, "Cielo y Tierra", Producer and Arranger
 Jorge Ferrón, "Ferrón", Co-Producer
 Alvaro Abitia, "Tradúceme", A&R and Executive Producer
 DJ Crysler, "Cabaret Mix", A&R
 Nudo, "Nudo", A&R
 Alejandro Filio, "Filio", Arranger and programmer
 Rodrigo Noriega, "Rodrigo", A&R and Executive Producer 
 Ilse, "Africa", Composer 
 La Quinta Avenida, "La 5a Av.", Co-Producer
 Agua Luna, "Agua Luna", Composer
 Crista Galli, "Crista Galli", Arranger and programmer
 Various Artists, "El Ultimo Adiós", Vocal director
 Warner Music Artists, "Diciembre 25", Arranger and programmer

References

1964 births
Living people
Mexican musicians